Erling Eriksen (January 19, 1878 – 1957) was a Norwegian film director, screenwriter, and film producer.

Eriksen was born in Kristiania (now Oslo). He directed his only film, the comedy Kjærlighet paa pinde, in 1922, for which he also wrote the screenplay. In 1925 he produced Harry Ivarson's film Fager er lien.

Filmography

Director and screenwriter
1922: Kjærlighet paa pinde

Producer
1925: Fager er lien

References

1878 births
1957 deaths
Norwegian film directors
Norwegian screenwriters
Norwegian film producers
Film people from Oslo
20th-century screenwriters